Melania Ridge is a basalt ridge running southeast for  from Mount Melania, on Black Island in the Ross Archipelago, Antarctica. It was named by the Advisory Committee on Antarctic Names (1999) in association with Mount Melania.

References

External links

Ridges of the Ross Dependency
Black Island (Ross Archipelago)